Everett Wilson Stewart (July 18, 1915 – February 10, 1982) was an American flying ace of World War II with 7.83 aerial victories and 1.5 ground victories.

Early life
Stewart was born on July 18, 1915, in Talmage, Kansas. He was commissioned a 2nd lieutenant through the Army ROTC program at Kansas State University on May 30, 1938, and then enlisted in the Aviation Cadet Program of the U.S. Army Air Corps on June 23, 1938.

Military career

World War II
Stewart completed pilot training, was commissioned a 2nd lieutenant in the Army Air Corps, and was awarded his pilot wings on May 26, 1939.

His first assignment was flying P-40 Warhawk and P-39 Airacobra fighters with the 79th Pursuit Squadron of the 20th Pursuit Group at Moffett Field and Hamilton Field in California, from June 1939 to February 1941, followed by service in Hawaii and on Midway Islands until September 1942. He quickly rose to the rank of squadron commander.

After the Battle of Midway, he was given command of the 328th Fighter Squadron of the 352nd Fighter Group, which was sent to England in mid-1943. Flying the P-47 Thunderbolt, he was credited  with the shared destruction of 2 enemy aircraft in aerial combat plus 1 damaged.

In January 1944, he was transferred to the 355th Fighter Group. He became the group's commanding officer in November 1944 to February 1945. During this time, Stewart destroyed 7 enemy aircraft in the air with 1 probable and 2 damaged, while flying the P-51 Mustangs.

He was promoted to colonel in January 1945 and given command of the famous 4th Fighter Group from February 1945 to the end of the war. While in command of 4th FG, he was credited in damaging a jet powered Me 262 in March 1945.

After his serving with 4th Fighter Group, he was assigned to the Occupation duty at Headquarters U.S. Air Forces in Europe at Wiesbaden, Germany, from September 1945 to March 1946.

During World War II, Stewart was credited with the destruction of 7.83 enemy aircraft in aerial combat, 1 probable, 4 damaged, and 1.5 on the ground while strafing enemy airfields.

Post war
Stewart served as an Operations and Training Staff Officer at Maxwell Field, from May to December 1946, and then at Tyndall Field, from December 1946 to August 1947. After completing Air Command and Staff School at Maxwell Air Force Base, Stewart served as an instructor and director with the Air Tactical School at Tyndall Air Force Base, from June 1948 to October 1950, followed by service as a director at Air Command and Staff School at Maxwell Air Force Base from October 1950 to July 1951.

He attended Air War College from July 1951 to June 1952, and then served with Headquarters U.S. Air Force in the Pentagon until August 1953. His next assignment was on the Joint Intelligence Group in the Office of the Joint Chiefs of Staff in the Pentagon from August 1953 to August 1956, followed by National Defense College in Canada from September 1956 to July 1957.

Stewart was Vice Commander of the 30th Air Division at Willow Run Air Force Station, from August 1957 to January 1959, Deputy for Operations for the 37th Air Division and then the 30th Air Division at Truax Field, from January 1959 to May 1960, and then Vice Commander of the 30th Air Division, also at Truax Field, from May to October 1960.

He served on the staff with Supreme Headquarters Allied Powers Europe at Louveciennes, France, from October 1960 to September 1962, and then served as Senior Air Force Advisor to the 136th Air Defense Wing at USNAS Dallas, from October 1962 to October 1964. His final assignment was at McConnell Air Force Base.

Stewart retired from the Air Force on February 1, 1966.

Later life
Stewart died of a heart condition on February 10, 1982, and is buried at Restland Memorial Park in Dallas, Texas.

Aerial victory credits

SOURCES: Air Force Historical Study 85: USAF Credits for the Destruction of Enemy Aircraft, World War II

Awards
During his lengthy career, Stewart earned many decorations, including:

References

1915 births
1982 deaths
American World War II flying aces
Aviators from Kansas
Recipients of the Air Medal
Recipients of the Silver Star
Recipients of the Legion of Merit
Recipients of the Distinguished Flying Cross (United States)
Recipients of the Croix de Guerre 1939–1945 (France)
Recipients of the Distinguished Flying Cross (United Kingdom)
United States Air Force officers
United States Army Air Forces officers
United States Army Air Forces pilots of World War II
People from Abilene, Kansas